Charles Kirkpatrick (29 December 1894 Lafayette, Indiana – 4 May 1975 Lafayette, Indiana) was an American racecar driver.

Indianapolis 500 results

Source:

References

Indianapolis 500 drivers
1894 births
1975 deaths
Sportspeople from Lafayette, Indiana
Racing drivers from Indiana